Jamie Murray and John Peers were the defending champions, but lost in the quarterfinals to Facundo Bagnis and Federico Delbonis.
Andre Begemann and Robin Haase won the title, defeating Rameez Junaid and Michal Mertiňák in the final, 6–3, 6–4.

Seeds

Draw

Draw

References
 Main Draw

Credit Agricole Suisse Open Gstaad - Doubles
2014 Doubles
2014 Crédit Agricole Suisse Open Gstaad